Euphorbia antso is a species of plant in the family Euphorbiaceae. It is endemic to Madagascar.  Its natural habitat is subtropical or tropical dry shrubland. It is threatened by habitat loss.

References

Endemic flora of Madagascar
antso
Least concern plants
Taxonomy articles created by Polbot